Maurice Henry "Skip" Palrang (November 30, 1906 – February 8, 1978) was an American minor league baseball player and football coach. He served as the head football coach at Creighton University in Omaha, Nebraska from 1940 to 1942, compiling a record of 16–11–2. 
He was Creighton's final head football coach before the program folded after the 1942 season. After World War II, Palrang served as the head football and basketball coach at Boys Town, Nebraska.

Head coaching record

College

References

External links
 Nebraska High School Sports Hall of Fame profile
 

1906 births
1978 deaths
Creighton Bluejays football coaches
Des Moines Demons players
High school football coaches in Nebraska
Sportspeople from Boston